Skogrand is a surname. Notable people with the surname include:

Kjetil Skogrand (born 1967), Norwegian historian and politician
Samantha Skogrand (born 1989), Norwegian television presenter
Stine Skogrand (born 1993), Norwegian handball player

See also
Ingeborgrud

Norwegian-language surnames